The canton of Longvic is an administrative division of the Côte-d'Or department, eastern France. It was created at the French canton reorganisation which came into effect in March 2015. Its seat is in Longvic.

It consists of the following communes:
 
Bévy
Bretenière
Brochon
Chambœuf
Chambolle-Musigny
Chevannes
Collonges-lès-Bévy
Couchey
Curley
Curtil-Vergy
Détain-et-Bruant
L'Étang-Vergy
Fénay
Fixin
Gevrey-Chambertin
Longvic
Messanges
Morey-Saint-Denis
Ouges
Perrigny-lès-Dijon
Reulle-Vergy
Segrois
Semezanges
Ternant
Urcy
Valforêt

References

Cantons of Côte-d'Or